Deresh Ramjugernath FAAS is a South African professor of Engineering Technology & Applied Sciences. He was a Deputy Vice-Chancellor of Research at the University of KwaZulu-Natal (UKZN) and the current Deputy Vice-Chancellor of Learning and Teaching at Stellenbosch University (SU).

Education 

Ramjugernath completed all of his studies at the University of KwaZulu-Natal. He first obtained a degree in BSc in Chemical Engineering in 1993, followed by an MSc in 1995, and a Ph.D. in Chemical Engineering in 2000.

Career and research 
Ramjugernath became a professor of chemical engineering at the age of 31 at the University of KwaZulu-Natal. In 2007, he became the Assistant Dean of Research and Postgraduate Studies at the Faculty of Engineering of the same University. He also served as the Deputy Vice-Chancellor of Research and Pro Vice-Chancellor of Innovation, Commercialization, and Entrepreneurship before he was appointed as the deputy Vice-Chancellor of Learning and Teaching at the Stellenbosch University.

Ramjugernath research centered around Thermodynamics / Separation including high-pressure vapor-liquid equilibria, low-pressure vapor-liquid equilibria, liquid-liquid equilibria, phase equilibria with chemical reaction, pyrolysis, high-temperature thermodynamics, gas hydrate separation, and high-pressure plasma reactors.

Awards and honours 
Ramjugernath was elected a Fellow of the Academy of Sciences of South Africa, the African Academy of Sciences since 2015, and a Fellow of the South African Academy of Engineering.

He is received the President’s Award from the National Research Foundation (NRF), and the National Science and Technology Forum (NSTF), South Africa. He was also the recipient of Vice-Chancellor's Research Award from the University of KwaZulu-Natal.

Selected publications 

 Eslamimanesh, Ali; Mohammadi, Amir H.; Richon, Dominique; Naidoo, Paramespri; Ramjugernath, Deresh (2012-03-01). Application of gas hydrate formation in separation processes: A review of experimental studies. The Journal of Chemical Thermodynamics. Thermodynamics of Sustainable Processes. 46: 62–71. doi:10.1016/j.jct.2011.10.006. ISSN 0021-9614.
 Nannoolal, Yash; Rarey, Jürgen; Ramjugernath, Deresh; Cordes, Wilfried (2004-12-10). Estimation of pure component properties: Part 1. Estimation of the normal boiling point of non-electrolyte organic compounds via group contributions and group interactions. Fluid Phase Equilibria. 226: 45–63. doi:10.1016/j.fluid.2004.09.001. ISSN 0378-3812.
 Nannoolal, Yash; Rarey, Jürgen; Ramjugernath, Deresh (2008-07-25). Estimation of pure component properties: Part 3. Estimation of the vapor pressure of non-electrolyte organic compounds via group contributions and group interactions. Fluid Phase Equilibria. 269 (1): 117–133. doi:10.1016/j.fluid.2008.04.020. ISSN 0378-3812.
 Letcher, Trevor M.; Soko, Bathebele; Ramjugernath, Deresh; Deenadayalu, Nirmala; Nevines, Ashley; Naicker, Pavan K. (2003-03-18). Activity Coefficients at Infinite Dilution of Organic Solutes in 1-Hexyl-3-methylimidazolium Hexafluorophosphate from Gas−Liquid Chromatography. Journal of Chemical & Engineering Data. 48 (3): 708–711. doi:10.1021/je0256481. ISSN 0021-9568.

References 

Fellows of the African Academy of Sciences
South African scientists
University of KwaZulu-Natal alumni
Academic staff of Stellenbosch University
Academic staff of the University of KwaZulu-Natal